Dixie B. White (February 7, 1917 – October 24, 1990) was an American football coach. He was the fourth head football coach at Northeast Louisiana University in Monroe, Louisiana and he held that position for eight seasons, from 1964 until 1971. His coaching record at Northeast Louisiana was 31–45–1.

Playing career
White played college football as a guard at Texas Tech University from 1937 to 1939, including teams that advanced to the 1938 Sun Bowl and 1939 Cotton Bowl. He was captain of the team as a senior in 1939 and helped coach freshmen in 1940.

In 1983, White was inducted into the Texas Tech Hall of Honor.

Head coaching record

References

1917 births
1990 deaths
American football guards
Arkansas Razorbacks football coaches
Idaho Vandals football coaches
Louisiana–Monroe Warhawks athletic directors
Louisiana–Monroe Warhawks football coaches
Kentucky Wildcats football coaches
Midwestern State Mustangs football coaches
New Orleans Saints coaches
Texas Tech Red Raiders football players
High school football coaches in Texas
Sportspeople from Lubbock, Texas
Coaches of American football from Texas
Players of American football from Texas